The men's double sculls event was part of the rowing programme at the 1920 Summer Olympics. The competition was held from 27 to 29 August 1920. It was the second appearance of the event, which had previously been held only at the rowing competitions in 1904. Ten rowers, in five pairs from five different nations, competed.

Results

Semifinals

Final

References

Sources
 
 

Rowing at the 1920 Summer Olympics